Rema costimacula is a species of moth of the family Erebidae first described by Achille Guenée in 1852. It is found in the north-eastern Himalayas, Thailand, Peninsular Malaysia, Sumatra, Borneo and Sulawesi.

Adults have pale brown forewings, conspicuously marked with two triangles and a quadrilateral block in black along the costa.

The larvae feed on Amphicarpaea species.

Subspecies
Rema costimacula costimacula
Rema costimacula triangulata Walker, 1865 (Himalayas)

References

Moths described in 1852
Calpinae
Moths of Asia